is a Japanese professional footballer who plays as a left back for J1 League club Cerezo Osaka.

Club career
Kakeru Funaki joined Cerezo Osaka in 2016. On March 20, he debuted in J3 League (v Fujieda MYFC).

National team career
In May 2017, Funaki was elected Japan U-20 national team for 2017 U-20 World Cup. At this tournament, he played 2 matches as left side back.

Career statistics

References

External links

Profile at Cerezo Osaka

1998 births
Living people
Association football people from Tokyo
Japanese footballers
Japan youth international footballers
J1 League players
J2 League players
J3 League players
Cerezo Osaka players
Cerezo Osaka U-23 players
SC Sagamihara players
Júbilo Iwata players
Association football defenders